Ronald Clark Duke III (born May 5, 1985) is an American actor, comedian, and director known for his roles in the films Kick-Ass, Sex Drive, and Hot Tub Time Machine, as well as playing Clark Green in the TV series The Office, Dale Kettlewell in Greek, and Barry in Two and a Half Men. Duke is also known for his role in I'm Dying Up Here as Ron Shack.

Life and career
Duke was born in Glenwood, Arkansas, and raised near Hot Springs, Arkansas, the son of Angela and Ronnie Duke. He was raised a Baptist. Duke graduated from Centerpoint High School in 2004.

In 1992, he was nominated for a Young Artist Award as an "Outstanding Actor Under Ten in a Television Series" for his work on Hearts Afire.

Along with best friend Michael Cera, Duke created, wrote, directed and produced the web series Clark and Michael in which he plays a fictional version of himself. The pilot episode was directed by Duke as his college thesis film at Loyola Marymount University.

He was a regular on the television series Greek as Rusty's Christian dorm roommate Dale. Duke appeared in the film Superbad in the small role of 'Party Teenager #1'.

In February 2008, he starred in Volume 2 of the web video series Drunk History with Jack Black, which can be found on YouTube. Michael Cera had appeared in the previous episode, Drunk History, Volume 1.

In 2008, Duke had his first co-starring film role in Sex Drive. He co-starred with Eddie Murphy in A Thousand Words, which was completed in 2008 but remained unreleased until 2012. He appeared in Kick-Ass with Aaron Taylor-Johnson and Nicolas Cage, and played Jacob, the nephew of Adam Yates (John Cusack) in Hot Tub Time Machine. He voiced Thunk in the 2013 animated film, The Croods.

In 2010, he had a cameo in a Kid Cudi music video "Erase Me".

He also appeared as Clark Green in the ninth and final season of the American version of The Office. He reprised his role from Kick-Ass in its sequel Kick-Ass 2, released August 2013.

Duke made his major motion picture directorial debut in 2020 with the film Arkansas, about two friends who live in Arkansas and work for a Chicago-based drug kingpin, whom they have never met. Set in his home state, Duke co-starred with Liam Hemsworth, Michael Kenneth Williams, Vince Vaughn, John Malkovich, and Vivica A. Fox.

He voiced Brett Hand in the Netflix series Inside Job.

Filmography

Awards and nominations

References

External links

1985 births
Male actors from Arkansas
American male child actors
American male film actors
American male voice actors
American male television actors
American male screenwriters
Film directors from Arkansas
Living people
People from Pike County, Arkansas
Baptists from the United States
The Long Goodbye (band) members